Allier is a department in south-central France.

Allier may also refer to:

Places 
 Allier (river), in France
 Allier, Hautes-Pyrénées, a commune of the Hautes-Pyrénées department, in southwestern France

People 
 Carolina Allier, Mexican badminton player
 Thomas Allier (born 1975), French BMX rider